Hannah Weinstein ( Dorner; June 23, 1911 – March 9, 1984) was an American journalist, publicist and left-wing political activist who moved to Britain and became a television producer. She is best remembered for having produced The Adventures of Robin Hood television series in the mid-to-late 1950s.

Early life

Born to a Jewish family in New York City, After graduating with a degree in journalism from New York University, Weinstein worked for the New York Herald Tribune from 1927. In 1937, she left the newspaper to join Fiorello H. La Guardia's mayoral campaign in New York City. She was also involved in the presidential campaigns of Franklin D. Roosevelt and Henry Wallace. With Ring Lardner Jr., she wrote speeches for Charlie Chaplin and Orson Welles during this period.

Exile
In 1950, Weinstein began her film career in Paris having left the US to avoid the rise of anticommunism, as typified by the House Un-American Activities Committee (HUAC). 

In 1952, after settling in London, she established her own production company, Sapphire Films, financially aided by the American Communist Party. The company eventually made series for the British commercial ITV network via an arrangement with ITC's Lew Grade. Weinstein created and executive produced The Adventures of Robin Hood (1955–59), starring Richard Greene. The first two series were syndicated by Official Films to American television stations; they also dwell on the theme of betrayal.

Weinstein created the series with the intention of helping blacklisted American writers. She commissioned scripts by 22 Americans writers blacklisted after being identified as communists by HUAC, such as Waldo Salt, Ring Lardner Jr., Ian McLellan Hunter who all adopted pseudonyms (they were still generally living in Los Angeles and New York City, usually with their passports confiscated), but were paid less than their usual fees. 

Weinstein instituted security measures to ensure that the writers' true identities remained secret. Louis Marks, one of the series' script editors later remarked: "Had even a hint of this leaked, the whole enterprise would have foundered". Sonia, Marks' wife who worked as Weinstein's assistant, was told never to accept registered post in case it was a subpoena to appear at a HUAC hearing. 

The FBI considered Weinstein a "concealed Communist". It discovered by 1955, via an American embassy agent, that Sapphire Films was "influenced by the communists" but no action against the company is recorded. Director J. Edgar Hoover was aware that the British press was largely in opposition to  McCarthyism.

The success of Robin Hood led Weinstein to create a further four television series, The Buccaneers (1956–57), The Adventures of Sir Lancelot (1956–57), Sword of Freedom (1958–60) and The Four Just Men (1959, as Hannah Fisher).

Sapphire Films ceased to function in late 1961 owing to financial problems. Weinstein returned to America in 1962. She organized a rally in Madison Square Garden to raise funds for the election of United States senators opposed to the Vietnam War.

Later career
In 1971, Weinstein founded the Third World Cinema Corporation with Ossie Davis, James Earl Jones and Rita Moreno to produce films with members of minority communities. She produced the Oscar nominated film Claudine (1974), featuring a cast including Diahann Carroll and James Earl Jones, in a story about an African American family struggling through hard times and racism. She later produced Greased Lightning (1977) and Stir Crazy (1980), both of which star comedian Richard Pryor.

In 1982, she was awarded the Women in Film Crystal Award for outstanding women who, through their endurance and the excellence of their work over their lifetime, have helped to expand the role of women within the entertainment industry. In 1984, she was named for the Liberty Hill Foundation Upton Sinclair Award in honor of her artistic and political accomplishments.

Personal life
In 1938, she married Pete Weinstein, a reporter for The Brooklyn Eagle; the couple divorced in 1955. They had three daughters, Dina, Paula (married to Mark Rosenberg), and Lisa. 

Weinstein died at age 72 following a heart attack at her home on Park Avenue, New York City on March 9, 1984; services were held at Riverside Memorial Chapel.

References

External links

1911 births
1984 deaths
American communists
American film producers
Jewish American journalists
American television producers
American women television producers
British television producers
British women television producers
Hollywood blacklist
Journalists from New York City
Television producers from New York City
20th-century American businesspeople
20th-century American businesswomen